Newton Forster or, the Merchant Service is an 1832 novel by the British writer Frederick Marryat. Like much of Marryat's work it is a seafaring novel about a young man impressed into the Royal Navy during the Napoleonic Wars. He is subsequently imprisoned by the French, shipwrecked in the West Indies and makes a success in trading in the East Indies.

Marryat was a supporter of the West Indian pro-slavery lobby. Responding to contemporary threats of the Jamaican planters to secede from the British Empire, following London's move towards abolition, and join with the United States then considered more sympathetic to slavery, Marryat wrote that the inhabitants would "not flinch and the island of the Caribbean will be inrolled [sic] as another star, and add another stripe to the independent flag, which is their natural protector".

References

Bibliography
 Taylor, Michael. The Interest: How the British Establishment Resisted the Abolition of Slavery. Random House, 2020.

1832 British novels
Novels set in England
Novels by Frederick Marryat